John Gale (born October 23, 1940) is from North Platte, Nebraska, and served as the 26th Secretary of State of Nebraska from 2000 until 2019. He is a member of the Republican Party.

Early life
John A. Gale was born in Omaha, Nebraska and graduated from Omaha North High School. He earned his B.A. in Government and International Relations at Carleton College in Northfield, Minnesota in 1962. In 1965, Gale graduated with a J.D. from the University of Chicago Law School.

Professional background
After law school, Gale held legal positions in the private and public sectors. He worked in the legal department at Northern Natural Gas Company in Omaha. From 1968 to 1970, he served as a legislative assistant to U.S. Senator Roman Hruska of Nebraska and was responsible for agricultural appropriations, foreign relations, and constitutional law issues. In 1970, he returned to Nebraska to work as an Assistant U.S. Attorney, first in Omaha and then in Lincoln.

Gale and his family moved to North Platte, Nebraska in 1971, where he entered the private practice of law. He practiced law there for 29 years.

He is a former Chairman of the Nebraska Republican Party, former Chairman of the Mental Health Board for Lincoln County, former President of the 11th Judicial District Bar Association, former Chairman for the North Platte Chamber of Commerce Government Affairs Committee, and former President for the North Platte Sunrise Rotary Club.

Gale ran unsuccessfully for the U.S. House of Representatives in 2000. He was defeated by former U.S. Representative Tom Osborne for the Republican nomination.

Secretary of State
Gale was appointed to fill a vacancy at Secretary of State in December 2000 by Governor Mike Johanns. He was elected Secretary of State in 2002, defeating his Democratic Party opponent, Jay Stoddard. He was reelected in 2006, defeating Stoddard again. In 2010, Gale won re-election against Democratic Party opponent Janet Stewart. In 2014, Gale won re-election against Libertarian Party opponent Ben Backus.

As Secretary of State, Gale implemented major election improvements in Nebraska to meet the requirements of the federal Help America Vote Act. Under his leadership, all Nebraska counties received new ballot tabulation equipment and switched to a computerized statewide voter registration system. He promoted efforts to increase voter participation. Nebraska set new turnout records in both the 2004 and 2008 presidential elections.

At his request, he was designated chief protocol officer for international relations by the Legislature. In that role, he promoted commerce, educational studies and cultural exchange between foreign nations and Nebraska.

Gale was instrumental in getting the Legislature to overhaul and modernize state law dealing with notary publics.

As secretary of state and chairman of the state Records Board, he pushed for increased and improved online access to state government.

He championed efforts to provide civics education to the state’s youth, with the goal to encourage youth to become active citizens and lifelong voters.

Gale was a national leader on election reform and was active in the National Association of Secretaries of State. He served on the Executive Committee for NASS, including as a past chairman of its Business Services and International Relations committees. He is a current member of the U.S. Standards Board for the U.S. Election Assistance Commission and served in the past on the Technical Guidelines Development Committee for the U.S. Election Assistance Commission.

As Secretary of State, Gale was the chairman of the Nebraska Real Estate Commission, and served on the Nebraska State Records Board, Nebraska Collection Agency Licensing Board, Nebraska Accountability and Disclosure Commission, the Nebraska Canvassing Board, and the Nebraska Pardons Board. He is a board member for Cornhusker Boys State and the NebraskaLAND Foundation.

Family
Gale's family includes his wife, Carol; sons David of Fremont, Nebraska, and Steven of Laramie, Wyoming; daughter Elaine of Sacramento, California; and four grandsons.

Electoral history

References

1940 births
21st-century American politicians
Carleton College alumni
Living people
Nebraska Republicans
People from North Platte, Nebraska
Secretaries of State of Nebraska
State political party chairs of Nebraska
University of Chicago Law School alumni
Omaha North High School alumni